René Deck (born 8 June 1945) was a Swiss international footballer who played as a goalkeeper for a number of clubs in Switzerland, Greece and Germany.

Club career
Deck began his career in Switzerland, playing several seasons with Grasshopper Club Zürich. He won the goalkeeper of the year award three times.

Deck moved to Greece to play in the Greek first division with PAOK F.C. in the summer of 1974. The following season, he joined German second division side VfB Stuttgart.

International career
Deck made seven appearances for the Switzerland national football team.

References

External links
 

1945 births
Living people
Swiss men's footballers
Switzerland international footballers
FC Wettingen players
Grasshopper Club Zürich players
PAOK FC players
VfB Stuttgart players
FC Winterthur players
2. Bundesliga players
Association football goalkeepers